Al Piantadosi (born John Alberto Joseph Piantadosi; August 18, 1882 in New York City – April 8, 1955 in Encino, California) was an American composer of popular music during the  of Tin Pan Alley. He started out as a saloon and vaudeville pianist and rapidly flourished as a songwriter.  For about ten years (from 1918 to 1928) he was an independent music publisher.

Career
Piantadosi was born August 18, 1882, in the Italian Quarter of Manhattan, New York.  Early in his career ( 1906), Piantadosi gained recognition as "Ragtime Al," playing piano at Callahan's Dance Hall on Manhattan's at Chatham Square and Doyers Street in Chinatown, where he wrote the briefly popular "My Mariucci Take a Steamboat" with lyricist George Ronklyn (1878–1943), the bouncer at Callahan's known as "Big Jerry."

Piantadosi's compositions include "I'm Awfully Glad I'm Irish" (1910) and "That's How I Need You" (1912).  "The Curse of an Aching Heart" (1913) became his most famous tearjerker.  He also composed "Mississippi Days" (1916) and "If You Had All the World and Its Gold."

War protest and subsequent controversy
His composition, "I Didn't Raise My Boy to Be a Soldier" (1915) became a controversial protest song.  It sold 650,000 copies in the first three months, which helped establish American World War I pacifism as a quantifiable political reality. The song continued to sell well until the United States entered the World War I in 1917.  Then it was pretty much discarded.  However, a few pro-war writers modified the lyrics in new melodies, including "I Didn't Raise My Boy To Be A Coward," by Charles Clinton Case (1843–1918) (composer) and Franklin G. McCauley (lyricist) and "I Didn't Raise My Boy To Be A Slacker," a march by Theodore Baker (1917, G. Schirmer).

Copyright lawsuit
Harry Haas brought a plagiarism suit against Leo Feist, Incorporated, claiming that the melody was from a song he composed in 1914, "You'll Never Know How Much I Really Cared" — Bill Cahalin (né William R. Cahalin; born around 1883), lyricist. The plaintiffs won. And, although credit was never changed, Cahalin won a large settlement.  Adolph Deutsch (born 1868), a raincoat maker, was a one-third partner on the song with Haas and Cahalin.

Market successes
Five of his compositions exceeded sales of one million copies.

Industry advocacy
In 1914, Piantadosi became a charter member of the American Society of Composers, Authors, and Publishers (ASCAP).

Music publishing
In 1918, Al Piantadosi and his brother, George, founded Al. Piantadosi & Company, Inc.  Personnel that year included:
 Himself, Al Piantadosi, as President
 Herbert Inman Avery (1887–1955), General Manager
 Jack Glogau, Professional Manager
 George Piantadosi, Western Manager at 113 North Dearborn Street, Chicago; in February 1920, he left the firm to work for McCarthy & Fisher, Inc.
After reaching an agreement to pay creditors 10% in lieu of filing for protection under bankruptcy, Frank Goodman, an employee, paid it and took over the company.

From early 1923 to mid 1924, Piantadosi tried his hand at selling real estate lots in Hollywood.

Performing
He was a piano accompanist for several variety artist, including Anna Chandler.

Collaborators
Collaborators throughout his career included Alfred Bryan, Joe Goodwin (1889–1943), Edgar Leslie, Joseph McCarthy, and Irving Berlin. Ted Fiorito worked for him as a demonstrator, playing piano.

Later life and death
In 1931, with debt of $17,717 and assets of $500, Piantadosi filed for bankruptcy in U.S. District Court for the Eastern District of New York.

Piantadosi eventually moved to California, settling in Encino and worked in semi-retirement, operating Piantadosi Music Publications and Society Records.  He died in Encino, California, in 1955.

Selected works 
 "My Mariuccia" ("Take a Steamboat") "She's Gone Away"
 Al Piantadosi (music)
 George Ronklyn (1878–1943) (words)
 New York: Barron & Thompson (1906)
 

 "I'm A Yiddish Cowboy" ("Tough Guy Levi")
 Halsey K. Mohr, Al Piantadosi (music)
 Edgar Leslie (words)
 New York: Ted S. Barron (1908)
 

 "Good-Bye Mister Caruso"
 Al Piantadosi (music)
 Billy Dunham (words)
 New York: Harry Cooper Music Pub. Co. (1909)
  (pdf copy at the LOC)

 "Just Like The Rose"
 Al Piantadosi (music)
 Irving Berlin (words)
 New York: Harry Von Tilzer Music Publishing Co. (1909)
 

 "Good Luck Mary"
 Al Piantadosi (music)
 Alfred Bryan, Edgar Leslie (words)
 New York: Harry Cooper Music Pub. Co. (1909)
  (pdf copy at the LOC)

 "Skidamarink" ("Skid-dy-mer-rink-adink-aboomp")
 Al Piantadosi (music)
 Felix F. Feist (1883–1936) (words)
 New York: Leo Feist (1910)
  (pdf copy at the LOC)

 "Think It Over, Mary"
 Al Piantadosi (music)
 Thomas J. Gray (1888–1924) (words)
 New York: Leo Feist (1910)
  (pdf copy at the LOC)

 "The Vampire Love Song"
 Al Piantadosi (music)
 Edgar Leslie (words)
 New York: Leo Feist (1910)
  (pdf copy at the LOC)

 "That Dreamy Italian Waltz"
 Al Piantadosi (music)
 Joseph McCarthy (words)
 New York: Leo Feist (1910)
 

 "In All My Dreams, I Dream of You"
 Al Piantadosi (music)
 Joseph McCarthy (words)
 New York: Leo Feist (1910)
  (pdf copy at the LOC)

 "I'm Awfully Glad I'm Irish"
 Al Piantadosi (music)
 Edgar Leslie (words)
 New York: Leo Feist (1911)
 

 "That Italian Serenade"
 Al Piantadosi, Jack Glogau (né Jacob A. Glogau; 1886–1953) (music)
 Joseph McCarthy (words)
 New York: Leo Feist (1911)
  (pdf copy at the LOC)

 "Somehow I Can't Forget You"
 Al Piantadosi (music)
 Joseph McCarthy (words)
 New York: Leo Feist (1911)
  (pdf copy at the LOC)

 "I Just Met The Fellow That Married The Girl That I Was Going To Get"
 Al Piantadosi (music)
 Joseph McCarthy (words)
 New York: Leo Feist (1911)
 

 "Honey Man"
 Al Piantadosi (music)
 Joseph McCarthy (words)
 New York: Leo Feist (1911)
  (pdf copy at the LOC)

 "When Broadway Was A Pasture"
 Al Piantadosi (music)
 Joseph McCarthy (words)
 New York: Leo Feist (1911)
 

 "That's How I Need You"
 Al Piantadosi (words & music)
 New York: Leo Feist (1912)
  (pdf copy at the LOC)

 "The Curse of an Aching Heart"
 Al Piantadosi (music)
 Henry Fink (né Henri Finck; 1893–1963) (words)
 Rosenbaum Studios (cover art)
 New York: Leo. Feist Inc. (1913)
  (pdf copy at the LOC)

 "Any Boy Could Love a Girl Like You" 
 Al Piantadosi (music)
 Joe Goodwin (1889–1943), Joseph McCarthy (words)
 New York: Leo. Feist Inc. (1913)
 

 "Melinda's Wedding Day"
 Al Piantadosi (music)
 Joe Goodwin (1889–1943), Joseph McCarthy (words)
 New York: Leo. Feist Inc. (1913)
  (pdf copy at the LOC)

 "Then I'll Stop Loving You"
 Al Piantadosi (music)
 Joe Goodwin (1889–1943), Joseph McCarthy (words)
 New York: Leo. Feist Inc. (1913)
  (pdf copy at the LOC)

 "At The Yiddish Wedding Jubilee"
 Al Piantadosi, Jack Glogau (né Jacob A. Glogau; 1886–1953) (music)
 Joseph McCarthy (words)
 New York: Leo Feist (1914)
 

 "I've Only One Idea About The Girls And That's To Love 'Em"
 Al Piantadosi (music)
 Earl Carroll, Joseph McCarthy (words)
 Rosenbaum Studios (cover art)
 New York: Leo Feist (1914)
  (pdf copy at the LOC)

 "On The Shores of Italy"
 Jack Glogau (né Jacob A. Glogau; 1886–1953) (music)
 Al Piantadosi (words)
 New York: Leo Feist (1914)
  (pdf copy at the LOC)

 "I've Loved You Since You Were a Baby" ("And Now I Can't Live Without You")
 Al Piantadosi (music)
 Joseph McCarthy (words)
 New York: Leo Feist (1914)
  (pdf copy at the LOC)

 "What a Wonderful Mother You'd Be"
 Al Piantadosi (music)
 Joe Goodwin (words)
 Edward H. Pfeiffer (1868–1932) (cover artist)
 New York: Shapiro, Bernstein & Co. (1915)
 

 "My Own Venetian Rose"
 Al Piantadosi, Jack Glogau (né Jacob A. Glogau; 1886–1953) (music)
 Joseph McCarthy (words)
 Rosenbaum Studios (cover art)
 New York: Leo Feist (1915)
  (pdf copy at the LOC)

 "When You're In Love With Someone"
 Al Piantadosi (music)
 Grant Clarke (words)
 New York: Leo Feist (1915)
 Rosenbaum Studios (cover art)
 

 "I Didn't Raise My Boy to Be a Soldier"
 Al Piantadosi (words)
 Alfred Bryan (lyrics)
 New York: Leo Feist (1915)
  (pdf copy at the LOC)

 "How Could Washington Be A Married Man?" ("And Never, Never Tell A Lie?")
 Al Piantadosi (music)
 Joe Goodwin, Ballard Macdonald (words)
 New York: Shapiro, Bernstein & Co. (1916)
 

 "Mississippi Days"
 Al Piantadosi (music)
 Ballard Macdonald (words)
 New York: Shapiro, Bernstein and Co. (1916)
 

 "On The Same Old Road"
 Al Piantadosi (music)
 John H. Flynn, Allan J. Flynn (words)
 New York: Al Piantadosi & Co., Inc. (1916)
 

 "If You Had All The World And Its Gold"
 Al Piantadosi (music)
 Bartley Costello, Harry Edelheit (words)
 New York: Al Piantadosi & Co., Inc. (1916)
  (pdf copy at the LOC)

 "Baby Shoes"
 Al Piantadosi (music)
 Joe Goodwin (1889–1943), Ed Rose (words)
 New York: Shapiro, Bernstein & Co. (1916)
 William Austin Starmer (cover art)
  (pdf copy at the LOC)

 "Send Me Away with a Smile"
 Al Piantadosi (words & music)
 New York: A. Piantadosi (1917)
 William Austin Starmer (cover art)
  (pdf copy at the LOC)

 "Someone Is Waiting For You"
 Al Piantadosi (words & music)
 New York: A. Piantadosi & Co. Inc. (1917)
 

 "For France and Liberty"
 Al Piantadosi (music)
 John H. Flynn, Allan J. Flynn (words)
 New York: Al Piantados & Co. (1917)
  (pdf copy at the LOC)

 "Wild, Wild Women Are Making a Wild Man of Me"
 Al Piantadosi (music)
 Henry Lewis, Al Wilson (words)
 New York: Al. Piantadosi & Co. Inc. (1917)
  (pdf copy at the LOC)

 "All Aboard for Home Sweet Home"
 Al Piantadosi, Jack Glogau (né Jacob A. Glogau; 1886–1953) (music)
 Addison Burkhardt (words)
 New York: Al. Piantadosi & Co (1918)
 

 From the 1918 musical farce Who Stole The Hat
 Conceived and staged by Jack Mason

 "Belgium Dry Your Tears"
 Al Piantadosi (music)
 Arthur Freed (words)
 Sachs (cover art)
 New York: Al Piantadosi & Co (1918)
  (pdf copy at the LOC)

 "I'm Making a Study of Beautiful Girls" ("And I'm Still In My A B C's")
 From Ziegfeld's Follies
 Al Piantadosi, Jack Glogau (né Jacob A. Glogau; 1886–1953) (music)
 Eddie Cantor (words)
 New York: Al Piantadosi & Co (1918)
 (pdf copy at the LOC)

 "What An Army Of Men We'd Have If They Ever Drafted The Girls"
 Jack Glogau (né Jacob A. Glogau; 1886–1953), Al Piantadosi (words & music)
 New York: Al. Piantadosi and Co. Inc. (1918)
 

 "The Woman Thou Gavest Me"
 (from the 1919 film of the same title, directed by Ford)
 Al Piantadosi (words & music)
 New York: Al. Piantadosi and Co. Inc. (1919)
 

 "Rose of the Evening"
 Al Piantadosi (music)
 Nils T. Granlund (words)
 May Singhi Breen (ukulele accompaniment)
 New York: Leo Feist (1920)
 

 "Pal of My Cradle Days"
 Al Piantadosi (music)
 Marshall Montgomery (pseudonym of "Marshall Albert Smith) (words)
 May Singhi Breen (arranger of ukulele accompaniment)
 New York: Leo Feist (1925)
 

 "Behind These Gray Walls"
 Carson Robison (music)
 Ed. Lovey (pseudonym of Al Piantadosi) (words)
 New York: Shapiro, Bernstein & Co. (1926)
 

 "I've Got The Stock Market Blues"
 Al Piantadosi, Jack Glogau (né Jacob A. Glogau; 1886–1953) (words & music)
 Ralph Colicchio (1896–1966)
 © April 10, 1929

 "My Stormy Weather Pal"
 Al Piantadosi (words & music)
 Al Piantadosi (1929)

 "A Whistle Girl At A Whistle Stop"
 Jean Schwartz, Dick Coburn, Al Piantadosi (words & music)
 (1948)

Cover art

Selected recordings 
 Sinatra Swings (Swing Along With Me) (album) (1961) (audio on YouTube)
 Frank Sinatra with the Billy May Orchestra
 Reprise FS 1002
 "Curse of an Aching Heart," arranged by Billy May
 

 "Pal of My Cradle Days" (45 rpm single) (1981) (audio on YouTube)
 Ann Breen (vocalist), Homespun Records HS 52
 Re-released 2002 (CD) by Castle Pulse/Sanctuary Records

Pseudonyms of Piantadosi 
 Ed. Lovey — "Ed." was likely an abbreviation for the given name of his wife, Edna Hannah Robinson (maiden; 1889–1962); "Lovey" was the maiden name of his wife's mother, Bertha (née Lovey; 1858–1936)
 A.P.

Family 
Al Piantadosi's nephew, Arthur Piantadosi (1916–1994), was a sound engineer, notably for motion pictures in Hollywood.

Notes

References

External links
 Al Piantadosi recordings at the Discography of American Historical Recordings.

American male composers
American composers
American pianists
1882 births
1955 deaths
American anti-war activists
American publishers (people)
Activists from New York (state)
Musicians from New York City
American male pianists
20th-century American male musicians
20th-century American pianists